Tims Ford State Park, also known as Tims Ford State Rustic Park, is a state park in Franklin County, in the U.S. state of Tennessee. The  state park is situated on the north shore of Tims Ford Lake near the north escarpment of the Cumberland Plateau, about ten miles from the city of Winchester.

History
The park opened in 1978 with 478 acres, a visitor center, 20 cabins and 50 camp sites.  The first expansion was almost 20 years later with the government purchasing 1,100 acres and the opening of the 6,790 yard Bear Trace Tims Ford Golf Course designed by Jack Nicklaus in 1999.  Since the year 2000, the park expanded further with the addition of approximately 2,000 additional acres to its current 3,546 acres

Geography

Geologically, the park is located in the Highland Rim province, a hilly, slightly dissected area characterized by karst topography and scattered knobs. Terrain within the park is generally steep, except when approaching the lake shore.

Tims Ford Lake, from which the park takes its name, was formed by a TVA hydroelectric dam over the Elk River. This dam was completed in 1970. The lake itself is named after an early river crossing.

Amenities
The park has 11 hiking and biking trails.

Facilities and management

The park is open year round and is managed by the Tennessee Department of Environment and Conservation.

The park includes 11 hiking trails, two campgrounds, two pavilions, a marina, and an 18-hole golf course called The Bear Trace, designed by Jack Nicklaus.

References

External links

 Tims Ford State Park official website
 Park Brochure

State parks of Tennessee
Protected areas established in 1978
Protected areas of Franklin County, Tennessee
Nature centers in Tennessee